Shohada-ye Haftom-e Tir Metro Station, also simply called Haft-e Tir Metro Station is a railway station on Tehran Metro Line 1. It is located below Hafte Tir Square in the central business district of Tehran. It is between Taleghani Metro Station and Shahid Mofatteh Metro Station. It has connections to the Modarres Expressway and the Karimkhan Zand Boulevard.

Tehran Metro stations